Quintian or Quintianus (Latin), from Quintus, is a male given name meaning "the fifth" and may refer to:

People
Appius Claudius Quintianus (2nd century), nephew of Tiberius Claudius Pompeianus, involved in a plot to kill Commodus
Quintian of Rome (3rd century), Roman confessor and saint
Quintian of Évora (4th century), Bishop of Évora
Quintian, Lucius and Julian (5th century), African martyrs and saints
Quintian of Rodez (6th century), bishop and saint
Martyrs of Catania, Sicily